Horton in Ribblesdale is a small village and civil parish in the Craven district of North Yorkshire, England. It is situated in Ribblesdale  on the Settle–Carlisle Railway to the west of Pen-y-ghent.

Its population in the 2001 census was 498 people in 211 households; decreasing to 428 at the 2011 Census.

History
It is first attested as Horton in the Domesday Book of 1086, with in Ribblesdale being added already in the 13th century to distinguish it from Horton, Lancashire. The place-name Horton is a common one in England. It derives from Old English horu 'dirt' and tūn 'settlement, farm, estate', presumably meaning 'farm on muddy soil'.

Horton in Ribblesdale was historically a part of Ewcross wapentake in the West Riding of Yorkshire.  It became a parish town in the early 12th century when the church of St. Oswald was established. This church was historically associated with the Deanery of Chester, and was part of the Diocese of York – though today it is part of the Diocese of Leeds. The surviving parish records date back to 1556.

In the 13th century the village and parish were ruled by rival monastic orders at Jervaulx Abbey and Fountains Abbey. Their dispute stemmed from a 1220 transfer of property here by William de Mowbray to the Fountains monks, which challenged the primacy of an earlier grant by Henry III to Jervaulx's predecessors at Fors Abbey. Not until 1315 was this dispute firmly settled, when Edward II confirmed the Abbot of Jervaulx as Lord of Horton in Ribblesdale.

During the Dissolution of the Monasteries, the monks' interests at Horton in Ribblesdale was attributed with an annual income of £32 and 5 shillings; and was given to the Earl of Lennox. He, in turn, disposed of the manor lands about 1569 or 1570 to a syndicate consisting of John Lennard, Ralph Scrope, Ralph Rokebie, Sampson Lennard, William Forest, Robert Cloughe and Henry Dyxon.

It seems the manor lands were eventually held solely by the family of John Lennard, the first named member of the syndicate. His daughter Lady Anne Lennard married Sir Leonard Bosville of Bradburne in Kent and together they sold their interests at Horton in Ribblesdale during the reign of Charles II to a partnership consisting of Lawrence Burton, Richard Wigglesworth and Francis Howson.

In 1597 Horton in Ribblesdale, like so much of northern England, was struck by a killer plague. This is confirmed by the parish burial register, which lists 74 deaths that year compared to just 17 deaths during the preceding and succeeding years. Those lost to this pandemic amounted to roughly one-eighth of the parish's population.

In 1725, local squire John Armistead left an endowment to establish a free grammar school here.

Governance
The civil parish contains the hamlet of High Birkwith.

Visitor attractions
Horton in Ribblesdale is the traditional starting (and finishing) point for the Three Peaks walk. The Pennine Way and Ribble Way long-distance footpaths pass through the village.

The region is also popular for caving and potholing, with Alum Pot and the Long Churn cave system just to the north of the village, and Hull Pot and Hunt Pot on the western side of Pen-y-ghent in England.

The Three Peaks walk is an endurance challenge of   distance, including  of ascent and descent of the mountains of Pen-y-ghent, Whernside and Ingleborough all to be completed in under 12 hours which attracts thousands of walkers each year. The circuit is also used for a fell race in April, while the Three Peaks cyclo-cross race also visits the three summits in the course of a longer  route on the last Sunday in September. Participants in both the running and cycling race regularly achieve winning times of around three hours, and sometimes both races in the year are won by the same competitor.

Local architecture and amenities

The village has two pubs, the Crown Hotel and the Golden Lion, as well as a cafe and tea-rooms. The village post office that was previously located in the now-closed village store is now located in the Crown Hotel. In 2006 a villager controversially installed a radio telescope.

The Grade I listed village church is dedicated to St. Oswald. It has a complete Norman nave, south door and tub-font and is the most complete of the Norman churches built in the Yorkshire Dales after the Norman conquest and the Harrying of the North that followed. The square tower was built later. The lychgates to enter the churchyard are roofed with slabs of Horton slate.

Other buildings in Horton are typical of the area. 17th-century yeomen's farmhouses can be found on the edge of the village, and later cottages can be seen nearer the centre of the village. In the 1870s the new railway prompted the building of Victorian terraced housing. Later the local quarrying of limestone led to the building of housing for the quarrymen.

Gallery

See also
Horton-in-Ribblesdale railway station

References

External links

Villages in North Yorkshire
Civil parishes in North Yorkshire
Ribblesdale